Caldwell Creek is a 3rd order tributary of Pine Creek in Warren County and Crawford County, Pennsylvania in the United States.

Variant names
According to the Geographic Names Information System, it has also been known historically as:  
East Branch Caldwell Creek

Course
Caldwell Creek rises about 0.5 miles south of Torpedo, Pennsylvania in Warren County and then flows south through Warren County into Crawford County to Pine Creek about 1 mile northeast of East Titusville, Pennsylvania.

Watershed
Caldwell Creek drains  of area, receives about 44.7 in/year of precipitation, and has a wetness index of 422.49 and is about 75% forested.

See also
List of rivers of Pennsylvania

References

Additional Maps

Rivers of Pennsylvania
Tributaries of the Allegheny River
Rivers of Crawford County, Pennsylvania
Rivers of Warren County, Pennsylvania